This is a listing of official albums and singles released by the British comedy trio The Goodies.

Studio albums

Compilation albums

EPs

Singles

See also
 The Goodies
 The Goodies (TV series) 
 The Goodies videography — the Goodies on DVD and VHS
 List of The Goodies episodes

References

Discography
Discographies of British artists